is a former Japanese footballer.

Playing career
Takuya Komine played for Fukushima United FC from 2012 to 2014.

References

External links

1988 births
Living people
Nihon University alumni
Association football people from Fukushima Prefecture
Japanese footballers
J3 League players
Japan Football League players
Fukushima United FC players
Association football defenders